Events in the year 1903 in Bolivia.

Incumbents
President: José Manuel Pando (PL)
 First Vice President:
 Lucio Pérez Velasco (PL) (until 23 January)
 Vacant (starting 23 January)
 Second Vice President: Aníbal Capriles Cabrera (PL)

Events
 11 November - Treaty of Petrópolis with Brazil

Births
 6 February – Augusto Céspedes, journalist and diplomat (d. 1997)
 23 March – Germán Busch, 36th president of Bolivia (d. 1939)
 26 December – Carlos Montenegro, lawyer, politician, and writer (d. 1953)

Deaths

References

 
1900s in Bolivia
Bolivia
Bolivia
Years of the 20th century in Bolivia